The Electric Banana was a nightclub in Pittsburgh, Pennsylvania. Beginning as a disco in the 1970s, it was a punk rock music venue from 1980 until 2000, and helped establish a place in alternative culture for the city of Pittsburgh.

The venue hosted such acts as Black Flag, Circle Jerks, The Misfits, Hüsker Dü, Sonny Vincent and the Extreme, Half-Life, Dead Milkmen, Meat Puppets, Descendents, Rhythm Pigs, Snakefinger, Wreckless Eric, Ian Dury, Sepultura, Candlemass, Morbid Angel, New Model Army, They Might Be Giants, Minutemen, Jimmy’s Rose Farm, and countless others. Located at 3887 Bigelow Boulevard, it was transformed by owner Johnny "Banana" Zarra into an Italian restaurant called "Zarra's: A Taste Of Southern Italy."

History 

The Electric Banana became a punk rock club in early 1980, after stints as both a regular go-go bar and a gay go-go bar. Zarra and wife Judy (a former go-go dancer) took up an offer from local punk and other "unique" bands and artists who needed a venue to play. Within a couple of years, The Banana became the epicenter of Pittsburgh's punk scene. By 1982, most of the "name" bands of the national underground punk scene had played the Banana.

Amongst the local acts, there was the aforementioned Half-Life, Watch for Busses, The Cynics, S.M.D.(Screaming Mailboxes of Destiny), Boystown, The Beating, The Cowboys from Hell, the past three mentioned bands all had members in common which were Phil Crists (drums) Mike Kastelic currently of the Cynics (vocals) Rick Pegg (guitar/vocal) who died in 2008 and Ron Cambest (guitar/vocal). The Beating and the Cowboys from Hell also coined the phrase and developed the genre "CowPunk" by combining Cowboy music and Punk Rock creating a new sound. 99 cents, The Five, The Cardboards, Societys Victim, The visually outrageous Suburban Death Row & their punk rock soap opera; Savage Amused, Flak, 99 Cents, The Garden, White Wreckage, Moist, Real Enemy, The Feedback, The Throbbing Dogs (1995 House Band), AMS and Carsickness, all of which became regular acts at The Banana, and often "hosted" the national acts coming through.

Cultural impact 

A mention is made to the Electric Banana in the song "Pittsburgh" by They Might Be Giants on their 2004 Venue Songs Album.  The song concentrates on Mr. Smalls theater in Millvale, but The Banana is mentioned in the lines:
I still have dreams about a place / called the Electric Banana / where we're falling into space

The Electric Banana was also known for its stylized yellow matchbook covers. The image of a banana may have been copied from Andy Warhol's icon used for the Velvet Underground.

See also
 List of Italian restaurants

References 
Punk rock party ends with Blues-Barry Paris Pittsburgh Post Gazette August 30, 1979

Electric Banana is a Lab for New Music -Peter B King Pittsburgh Press February 6, 1986

Our Own Slice of Nirvana Pittsburgh Post-Gazette April 9, 1993

Music Makers Mike Kalina Pittsburgh Post Gazette Aug 9, 1976

Punk goes the trend - Mikie Kalinia Pittsburgh Post Gazette Jan 30, 1981

Tales from the Electric Banana—Pittsburgh's punk laboratory - By Doug Hughey Pittsburgh Post Gazette November 14, 2010

Pittsburgh’s Rocking Past – By A.J. of the X Mondesis House Blog January 2008

Pioneers of early Pittsburgh scene gather for a reunion weekend - By Scott Mervis, Pittsburgh Post-Gazette August 17, 2006

Local Scene: Introducing the Wandering Rocks - Scot Mervis Pittsburgh Post Gazette January 17, 2013

Tour pairs Reid Paley and a Pixie - Scot Mervis Pittsburgh Post Gazette February 12, 2013

External links 

 ElectricBananaClub.net
 pittsburghsigns.org
 Electric Banana Pitttsburgh Music History

Music venues in Pittsburgh
Restaurants in Pittsburgh
Italian restaurants in the United States